The Legacy Trail is an  multi-use recreational rail trail connecting Sarasota and Venice, Florida. It runs along a former portion of the Seminole Gulf Railway corridor (most of which was originally a Seaboard Air Line Railroad corridor). The trail runs from the Historic Venice Train Depot to Fruitville Road in Sarasota. The original segment of the trail from Venice to Palmer Ranch opened in 2008 and it was extended to central Sarasota in 2022.

Route description

The Legacy Trail begins in Venice at the Historic Venice Train Depot.  At the depot, which now operates as a bus terminal for SCAT, the trail connects to the Venetian Waterway Park (which runs south along the Intracoastal Waterway to the Gulf of Mexico).

From the Venice Depot, the trail runs north along the former rail corridor, crosses over the U.S. 41 Venice Bypass on an overpass, and enters Nokomis.  North of Nokomis, it crosses Dona Bay and passes through Laurel.  Another overpass carries the trail over Laurel Road.

North of Laurel, the trail passes underneath State Road 681 and runs through Oscar Scherer State Park, where it connects to the park's trails.  It continues north through Osprey and passes Culverhouse Nature Park near Palmer Ranch.

The trail crosses Clark Road just north of Palmer Ranch continues north through Bee Ridge and Sarasota Springs.

The trail crosses Bahia Vista Street and Phillippi Creek before turning west toward downtown Sarasota.  At Shade Avenue, A short spur continues west to School Avenue while the main trail turns north and passes Payne Park before terminating at Fruitville Road.

Historic elements

The Legacy Trail references its past as the area's railroad corridor. The trail's milepost numbers (numbered 885–902) correspond to the railroad's original mile numbering. Original trestle bridge crossings remain at South Creek (near Oscar Scherer State Park), Phillippi Creek, and a creek near Beneva Road. Information plaques are placed along the trail detailing the history of the railroad corridor. Roadway crossings on the original segment also include decorative railroad crossing signals with crossbucks reading Sarasota Rail Trail.

History

The railroad line from School Avenue (on the trail's spur) to a point near Beneva Road was initially built in 1903 by Seaboard Air Line Railroad (via their Florida West Shore Railway subsidiary) and was extended south from there to Venice in 1911.  Track from Shade Avenue north to Fruitville Road was built in 1927 by the Atlantic Coast Line Railroad (via their Tampa Southern Railroad subsidiary).  The two lines were consolidated onto the route the trail follows today in 1967 when the Atlantic Coast Line and Seaboard Air Line merged and became the Seaboard Coast Line Railroad (which later became part of CSX Transportation). 

In Venice, the railroad line was integral to the city's history and benefited the city's economy. The railroad was used by cadets and faculty of the Kentucky Military Institute for winter classes from 1933 to 1970, transported patients to Fred H. Albee's Florida Medical Center from 1932 to 1942, transported goods and servicemen to Venice Army Air Field during , and used by Ringling Bros. and Barnum & Bailey Circus, which was headquartered in Venice from 1959 to 1992. The circus was the last consistent service the rail line carried.

Owing to decreased demand for service and the heavily deteriorated condition of the tracks and bridges, CSX Transportation and Seminole Gulf Railway, who had been leasing the line from CSX since 1987, came to an agreement with Sarasota County to abandon the railroad line south of Palmer Ranch. In return, Sarasota County, in conjunction with The Trust for Public Land, purchased and acquired the right of way in December 2004 for $11.75 million to use as a public recreational trail. The original  segment of Legacy Trail from Venice to Culverhouse Nature Park near Palmer Ranch opened to the public on March 28, 2008.

In 2011, a pedestrian overpass was built to carry the trail over the U.S. 41 Venice Bypass, a major six-lane highway. Another pedestrian overpass constructed by FDOT over Laurel Road started construction in November 2017 and was completed in late 2018.

In early 2017, Seminole Gulf Railway and CSX announced their intention to abandon an additional  of the remaining southern segment of the railroad up to a point just south of Fruitville Road.

In November 2018, Sarasota County voters approved a referendum to acquire and improve  of the former railroad corridor and extending the trail. By early 2020, Seminole Gulf removed tracks and signals from the corridor, and construction for the trail expansion started shortly after.

The first segments of the northern extension, which include the segment from the original trail at Culverhouse Nature Park to Sawyer Loop Road and the segment from Ashton Road to Bahia Vista Street opened on July 8, 2021. The segment from Sawyer Loop Road to Ashton Road opened on October 7, 2021. The final segment from Bahia Vista Street to Fruitville Road opened on March 3, 2022.

Future
The Legacy Trail is planned to be part of the Southwest Coast Regional Connector, an initiative by the Florida Department of Transportation to built a continuous multi-use trail from Tampa to Naples.

The Florida Department of Transportation plans to build overpasses for the trail at Clark Road and Bee Ridge Road.  They are planned be complete by 2024. The overpass over Clark Road will also include realigning its intersection with McIntosh Road.

North Port Connector
An connector trail to North Port is also under construction. The North Port Connector will connect to the Legacy Trail in Nokomis and run east along Florence Street, Edmondson Street, and Border Road.  It would then turn south along South Moon Drive, cross Interstate 75, and turn east along Forbes Trail.  The trail will then continue east along Interstate 75 and then turn south into North Port near Warm Mineral Springs.  An additional unpaved path would run from the North Port Connector south to Deer Prairie Creek Preserve.  The North Port connector would also connect to an unpaved trail through T. Mabry Carlton Reserve.

Gallery

References

External links

 Friends of The Legacy Trail, nonprofit organization established in 2006 that supports, promotes, enhances, and protects The Legacy Trail 
 TrailLink profile for Legacy Trail
 Legacy Trail at 100 Florida Trails

Transportation in Sarasota County, Florida
Hiking trails in Florida
Rail trails in Florida
Bike paths in Florida
Seaboard Air Line Railroad
Protected areas of Sarasota County, Florida
2004 establishments in Florida
Parks in Sarasota County, Florida